Michael Balfour Hutchison (18 July 1844 – 1921) was Dean of  Glasgow and Galloway from 1903 to 1920.

He was  born on 18 July 1844, educated at the Glasgow High School, the University of Glasgow, Worcester College, Oxford and Lincoln College, Oxford, ordained deacon in 1868, and priest in 1869, and was awarded the degree of Doctor of Divinity in 1905. After curacies in Norwich and Paisley, he was curate in charge at St Ninian, Glasgow, then its incumbent until 1920. He died in 1921.

In 1888 he published Hymnos Quosdam Hodiernos in ordine Temporum Ecclesiasticorum Dispositos Vetus ad Exemplar Reddidit M.B. Hutchison, a volume of translations of hymns into Latin verse.

References

Alumni of Lincoln College, Oxford
Alumni of Worcester College, Oxford
Deans of Glasgow and Galloway
1844 births
1921 deaths